Scalideutis is a genus of moths in the family Cosmopterigidae.

Species
 Scalideutis escharia Meyrick, 1906
 Scalideutis ulocoma Meyrick, 1918

References

Natural History Museum Lepidoptera generic names catalog

Scaeosophinae